Richardsville is an unincorporated community in Warren County, in the U.S. state of Kentucky.

History
A post office opened at Richardsville in 1872. The community was named after Thomas Richards, an early settler.

References

Unincorporated communities in Warren County, Kentucky
Unincorporated communities in Kentucky